South Christian High School (SCHS) is a private Christian high school in Byron Center, Michigan. It offers classes from the 9th through 12th grade. SCHS is affiliated with Moline Christian School, Byron Center Christian School, Dutton Christian School, Legacy Christian School, all of which provide K-8 Education.  They currently compete in the OK Gold Conference in sports.

Academics 

South Christian High School provides Advanced Placement courses in math, physics, social studies, and English.

Notable alumni 

 Ben Cook, golfer, made cut at 2021 PGA Championship
 Brian Diemer, Olympian
 David Kool, Division One basketball player and Mr. Basketball
 Brian Mast, Class of 1999, politician
 Matt Steigenga, Division One basketball player for the Michigan State Spartans and NBA Champion with the Chicago Bulls

References

Private high schools in Michigan
Educational institutions established in 1954
Schools in Kent County, Michigan
1954 establishments in Michigan
Christian schools in Michigan